The Schützenpanzer SPz 11-2 Kurz armoured infantry fighting and reconnaissance vehicle was developed for the West German army and was a minor modification of a French-designed vehicle (Hotchkiss SP1A). During the period between 1959 and 1967, the West German army received some 2,374 of these light armoured vehicles with the SPz 11-2 Kurz being developed as the reconnaissance version.  The SPz 11-2 served in cannon platoons of armored infantry battalions until 1974 and remained in service as a reconnaissance vehicle until 1982. The SPz 11-2 was replaced in the IFV role by the Marder and in the reconnaissance role by the Spähpanzer Luchs.  The SPz 11-2 saw service with the West German army only.

Its designator "Schützenpanzer Halbgruppe" already hinted on its combat rôle as the Infantry Fighting Vehicle ("Schützenpanzer") of a Squad ("Halbgruppe", literally "half a section", or Trupp). It was introduced besides the Schützenpanzer lang HS-30.

Armament
The only armament for the SPz 11-2 was the 20 mm Hispano-Suiza 820 L/85 cannon. The cannon has a 15x15 periscopic sight. 500 rounds of 20 mm ammunition were carried. Three smoke grenade launchers are provided for tactical and emergency concealment.

Variants
 Sanitätspanzer kurz 2-2 - Medevac vehicle.
 Beobachtungspanzer 22-2 - Forward observer vehicle.
 Mörserträger 51-2 - 81 mm mortar carrier.
 Radarpanzer 91-2 - Vehicle equipped with AN/TPS-33 radar.
 Nachschubpanzer 42-1 - Supply vehicle with four road wheels, originally the Hotchkiss CC-2-55 design.  Used from 1958 until 1962.
 Spähpanzer SP I.C. - Light tank armed with a 90 mm gun (prototype only)

Operators

Former operators
: Used by Bundeswehr until 1987.

Notes

External links

 SPz kurz at Panzerbaer.de 
 SPz kurz photo gallery at Hartziel.de  
   Webpage about the Hotchkiss

Armoured fighting vehicles of Germany
Reconnaissance vehicles of the Cold War
Military vehicles introduced in the 1950s